Albert Sidney Beckham (1897–1964) was the first African American to hold the title of school psychologist. He was a pioneering African American psychologist specializing in educational psychology and made significant contributions to the base of knowledge about the racial intelligence score disparity. Additionally, he taught in the New York public school system and was a professor at Wilberforce University and Howard University. He served the Chicago school district as their first African American school psychologist.

Education 
At the age of fifteen, Beckham enrolled at Lincoln University and was a fellow student of Francis Sumner, who would become the first African American to earn a Ph.D. in psychology. In 1915 Beckham graduated with a BA in psychology and began graduate study at Ohio State University the same year. While at Ohio State, he earned a second bachelor's degree in 1916 and a master's degree in psychology in 1917. From 1917 to 1920, Beckham served as an assistant professor of psychology at Wilberforce University.

In 1921, Beckham began his doctoral studies at Columbia University but transferred to New York University (NYU) because there was more financial aid available at NYU. In 1924, Beckham suspended his doctoral studies to accept an instructor position, and later an assistant professor, at Howard University, becoming the first person to teach psychology at the institution, and also opened the university's first psychology lab. After five years at Howard University, He went back to NYU to finish his doctorate.

Career and legacy 
Beckham's scholarly work largely focused on education; however, he also conducted studies on topics such as albinism, narcolepsy, race attitudes, and life satisfaction.

Beckham was a pioneer in the field of Black psychology and among the first African Americans to earn a PhD in psychology. He was a professor at Wilberforce University and Howard University and provided guidance to thousands of students in the Chicago public school system. Beckham spent most of his life fighting against discrimination of African American children, and hoped to use scientific research to bring equality between the races.  Much of his research was around the topic of intelligence, especially in African American adolescents. Beckham's research into this field found that the largest influences on intelligence were socio-economic background and the child's environment. Beckham was just one of several African American researchers testing African American intelligence, in order to provide evidence against claims made by anti-African American propaganda.

Working in Chicago, Beckham had access to a large population of African American children. He worked with the Institute of Juvenile Research to help understand the roots of juvenile delinquency. It was Beckham's belief that with the correct therapy, and an early behavioral diagnosis many juvenile children could have been helped from having any criminal record. Beckham also goes on to state in one of his publications, that juvenile delinquency could be severely reduced if individuals went off of scientific research rather than perceived stereotypes.

Selected works 
Beckham, A. S. (1924). Applied eugenics. Crisis, 28(1), 177–178.

Beckham, A. S. (1929). Is the Negro happy? Journal of Abnormal and Social Psychology, 24(2), 186–190. https://doi.org/10.1037/h0072938

Beckham, A. S. (1930). A study of intelligence of colored adolescents of different economic and social status in typical metropolitan areas [Doctoral dissertation, New York University]. https://library.nyu.edu

Beckham, A. S. (1931). Juvenile delinquency and the Negro. Opportunity, 9, 300–302.

Beckham, A. (1932). The Negro child of pre-school age. The Southern Workman, 61, 221–226.

Beckham, A. S. (1932). Race and intelligence. Opportunity, 10, 240–242.

Beckham, A. S. (1933). A study of the intelligence of colored adolescents of different social-economic status in typical metropolitan areas. The Journal of Social Psychology, 4(1), 70–91. https://doi.org/10.1080/00224545.1933.9921558

Beckham, A. S., (1933). Over-Suggestibility in Juvenile Delinquency.  The Journal of Abnormal and Social Psychology, 28(2), 172–178. http://dx.doi.org/10.1037/h0070124

Beckham, A. S., & Israeli, N. (1933). Political, racial, and differential psychology. The Journal of Social Psychology, 4, 1.

Beckham, A. S. (1934). A study of race attitudes in negro children of adolescent age. Journal of Abnormal and Social Psychology, 29(1), 18–29. https://doi.org/10.1037/h0070753

Beckham, A. S. (1939). The intelligence of a Negro high school population in a Northern city. The Pedagogical Seminary and Journal of Genetic Psychology, 54(2), 327–336. https://doi.org/10.1080/08856559.1939.10534339

Beckham, A. S. (1942). A study of social background and art aptitude of superior Negro children. Journal of Applied Psychology, 26(6), 777. https://doi.org/10.1037/h0056017

Beckham, A. S. (1942). A study of social background and music ability of superior Negro children. Journal of Applied Psychology, 26(2), 210–217. https://doi.org/10.1037/h0054822

Beckham, A. S. (1946). Albinism in Negro children. The Pedagogical Seminary and Journal of Genetic Psychology, 69(2), 199–215. https://doi.org/10.1080/08856559.1946.10533389

References 

1897 births
1964 deaths
People from Camden, South Carolina
20th-century American psychologists
Special education in the United States
Educational psychologists
American educational psychologists